Elections to the Sutherland District Council took place in May 1988, alongside elections to the councils of Scotland's various other districts. The number of seats and the total vote share won by each party is listed below.

Voter turnout was 54.1%.

References

1988 Scottish local elections